Bubsy is a series of platforming video games created by Michael Berlyn  and developed and published by Accolade. The games star an anthropomorphic bobcat named Bubsy, a character that takes inspiration from Super Mario Bros. and Sonic the Hedgehog. The games were originally released for the Super NES, Mega Drive/Genesis, Game Boy, Jaguar, PC and PlayStation during the 1990s.

There are six games that have been released in the series: Bubsy in: Claws Encounters of the Furred Kind, Bubsy II, Bubsy in: Fractured Furry Tales, Bubsy is 3D in "Furbitten Planet", Bubsy: The Woolies Strike Back and Bubsy: Paws on Fire! In 1996, a special version of the first game, titled Super Bubsy, was released for Windows 95. In 2015, a compilation of the first two games was released for Microsoft Windows through Steam, by Retroism, the video game software subsidiary of Tommo. In addition to the games, a television pilot was created for a Bubsy cartoon show based on the video game series, but it did not transition to become a full-fledged series.

History

Bubsy in: Claws Encounters of the Furred Kind 

The first Bubsy game was released in May 1993 by Accolade for the SNES, and later for the Genesis. The plot focuses on a race of fabric-stealing aliens called "Woolies", who have stolen the world's yarn ball supply (especially Bubsy's, who owns the world's largest collection). A special version, titled Super Bubsy, was later released in 1996 for Windows 95, featuring graphics redrawn for a higher resolution, new game elements and the entire Bubsy television pilot. In addition to the power-ups found in the original game, there are bouncing TVs that Bubsy can collect which allow the player to view more of the cartoon.

Bubsy 2 

Bubsy II was released shortly after the first game, on October 28, 1994. In the game, the antagonist, Oinker P. Hamm, has created his "Amazatorium", which actually saps information away from history, and puts it on display, for his personal profit. It's up to the player to control Bubsy and stop this. The game features five levels; a music-themed world, a medieval era, an Egyptian area, an outer space zone, and an aerial zone with Bubsy flying a World War I biplane. Bubsy collects trading cards which he can use to buy various items. These include a "portable hole" (a small portal he can step through and disappear to the main lobby), a diver's suit, a Nerf gun, screen-clearing smart bombs, or extra lives. The game features the addition of Bubsy's nephew and niece that can be played by another player to help or hinder Bubsy. There are also secret stages involving Bubsy and his unwilling sidekick, Arnold the Armadillo. Additionally, Bubsy could take two hits (denoted by his expression next to the "lives" counter), and on a third, he would lose a life – though some hazards will still instantly kill him. Bubsy II is also the only Bubsy title to be reprogrammed for the Game Boy as a black-and-white game with Super Game Boy support for limited colors. This version of the game features the three levels of difficulty, but only has three of the original worlds (Egyptian, Musicland and Skyland) available for play.

A Bubsy re-release titled Bubsy Two-Fur (a collection of the first two games) was released on Steam in December 2015 by a game company that owns abandonware game intellectual property called Retroism.

Bubsy in Fractured Furry Tales 

Bubsy in: Fractured Furry Tales was released on December 15, 1994, for the Atari Jaguar. This title sets Bubsy traversing across various fairy tales. The game sees Bubsy taking on the Mad Hatter in Alice in Wonderland, the Giant in Jack and the Beanstalk, the Djinni in Ali Baba and the 40 Thieves, a sea monster in Twenty Thousand Leagues Under the Sea and Hansel and Gretel in Candyland. The game plays similarly to the prior two games in the series, but without any of the gadgets or band-aids of Bubsy 2.

Bubsy is 3D in "Furbitten Planet" 

Bubsy 3D is the fourth Bubsy game, and was the only title in 3D. The game was released in 1996 for the PlayStation video game console. It is the sequel to the original in terms of the story and takes place on the Woolies' home planet, Rayon. Bubsy 3D has 16 main levels and two boss levels, and the main character's goal is to defeat the two queens of Rayon, Poly and Esther. The player can collect rockets, as well as atoms, in order to eventually escape from planet Rayon. Bubsy actively speaks throughout the game based on various actions performed by the player. A planned release for the Sega Saturn was cancelled.

Bubsy: The Woolies Strike Back 

In October 2017, a fifth Bubsy title, Bubsy: The Woolies Strike Back, was released for PlayStation 4 and PC. The game was developed by Black Forest Games, who previously worked on reviving the dormant Giana Sisters series with Giana Sisters: Twisted Dreams.

Bubsy: Paws on Fire! 

A sixth Bubsy title, Bubsy: Paws on Fire!, was released on May 16, 2019, for PlayStation 4 and PC. The game was developed by Choice Provisions, who previously worked on the Bit.Trip series and Woah, Dave!. The Nintendo Switch version was released shortly after in August 29.

The soundtrack by Stemage was released by Materia Collective on the same game's release date. A CD sampler containing the first 7 tracks of the soundtrack was included with the Limited Edition of the game.

Television pilot
Bubsy also had a pilot episode for an animated series sponsored by Taco Bell in 1993, titled What Could Possibly Go Wrong?. Calico Entertainment and Imagination Factory jointly produced the pilot for airing on Bohbot Communications Kid's Day Off syndication package for Thanksgiving 1993. It featured new additions to the Bubsy franchise not made by the original Bubsy producer (Michael Berlyn) as he was on hiatus from Accolade at the time. These included Virgil Reality, a genius inventor and scientist; Oblivia, Virgil's assistant and planned future love interest for Bubsy; Ally, the main antagonist, along with Buzz and Sid, her two Henchmen. The pilot was produced by Calico Creations. Rob Paulsen provides the voice of Bubsy, alongside voices from Tress MacNeille, Jim Cummings, Pat Fraley, B. J. Ward and Neil Ross. The pilot was not picked up for a full series. Virgil later appeared as a playable character in Bubsy: Paws on Fire!.

Reception 
Bubsy was awarded "Most Hype for a Character" of 1993 by Electronic Gaming Monthly. Bubsy also won GameFan's "Best New Character" award for 1993.

References

External links 

 Official website
 
 
 
 Sega-16 interview with Bubsy creator Mike Berlyn
 Sega-16 retrospective on the entire Bubsy series
 Playing Catch-Up: Bubsys Michael Berlyn – Gamasutra
 Steam Greenlight for Bubsy Two-Fur

Animated series based on video games
Anthropomorphic cats
Anthropomorphic video game characters
 
Comedy characters
Fantasy video game characters
Fictional felines
Male characters in video games
Steam Greenlight games
Television pilots not picked up as a series
Video game characters introduced in 1993
Video game mascots